Japanil Kalyanaraman is a 1985 Indian Tamil-language comedy film directed by S. P. Muthuraman, starring Kamal Haasan and Radha . A follow up to Kalyanaraman (1979), it is the first sequel film in Tamil cinema. The film was released on 11 November 1985 and performed poorly at the box office.

Plot 
Raman is a journalist who exposes a smuggling and black money racket, which involves the high-profile and his son Narendran, and is about to go public. The magazine is bought by Narendran overnight.

When Raman reveals that he is about to start his own magazine, he is beaten up by Narendran's men. After surviving miraculously, Raman, his son Arun, and the spirit of the now-dead Kalyanaraman, travel to Japan to buy printing equipment and to show Arun around.

In the comedy side plot, Mayilsamy and Muppaathaa win a lucky draw to visit Japan, guided by Munusamy.

Raman meets Radha, who is a waitress in a restaurant, and they gradually fall in love, with the efforts of Kalyanaraman and Arun. Meanwhile, Narendran also travels to Japan to get rid of Raman before he arrives back in India.

The movie ends with Raman helping to arrest Narendran and getting back together with Radha and Arun.

Cast 
 Kamal Haasan as Raman and Kalyanam
 Radha as Radha
 Sathyaraj as Narendran
 V. K. Ramasamy as Samikannu
 Major Sundarrajan
 Goundamani as Mayilsamy
 Kovai Sarala as Muppatha
 Chitra Lakshmanan as Munusamy Guide
 Master Tinku as Arun
 ISR as Textile showroom salesman
 Nazeem

Production 
Japanil Kalyanaraman is a sequel to the 1979 film Kalyanaraman, making that the first Tamil film to have a sequel. The film was predominantly shot in Japan. The buck tooth for Master Tinku was designed by Janakiraman, a dentist.

Soundtrack 
The music was composed by Ilaiyaraaja.

Reception 
Japanil Kalyanaraman was released on 11 November 1985. Kalki wrote the team had forgotten to pick up the screenplay while travelling to Japan. The film failed commercially because, according to the director, "it lacked the freshness the original version had".

References

External links 
 

1985 films
Films set in Japan
Films shot in Japan
Indian sequel films
Films directed by S. P. Muthuraman
1980s Tamil-language films
Films scored by Ilaiyaraaja
Indian romantic comedy films
Comedy of remarriage films
Films with screenplays by Panchu Arunachalam
Japan in non-Japanese culture
1985 romantic comedy films